Town square test is a threshold test for a free society proposed by a former Soviet dissident and human rights activist Natan Sharansky, now a notable politician in Israel. 

In his book The Case for Democracy,  published in 2004, Sharansky explains the term: "If a person cannot walk into the middle of the town square and express his or her views without fear of arrest, imprisonment, or physical harm, then that person is living in a fear society, not a free society. We cannot rest until every person living in a 'fear society' has finally won their freedom."

Usage
The test became famous after George W. Bush endorsed the book and Condoleezza Rice referenced it to characterize "a fear society" in her prepared remarks before the Senate Foreign Relations Committee on January 18, 2005:

Rice went on to identify Belarus, Burma, Cuba, Iran, North Korea, and Zimbabwe as examples of outposts of tyranny.

See also
 Democracy
 Political freedom
 Free speech zone

References

External links 
Town Square Test in Oxford, England

Political neologisms
Freedom of speech